Christian Martin Joachim (von) Frähn (4 June 1782 – 16 August 1851), German and Russian numismatist and historian, was born at Rostock, Mecklenburg-Schwerin.

Frähn began his Oriental studies under Tychsen at the university of Rostock, and afterwards continued them at Göttingen and Tübingen. He became a Latin master in Pestalozzi's famous institute in 1804, taught at Rostock as a Privatdozent in 1806, and in the following year was chosen to fill the chair of Oriental languages in the Russian university of Kazan. Though in 1815 he was invited to succeed Tychsen at Rostock, he preferred to go to St Petersburg, where he became director of the Asiatic museum and councillor of state. He died at St Petersburg.

Frähn wrote over 150 works. Among the more important are:
Numophylacium orientale Pototianum (1813)
De numorum Bulgharicorum fonte antiquissimo (1816)
Das muhammedanische Münzkabinett des asiatischen Museum der kaiserl. Akademie der Wissenschaften zu St Petersburg (1821)
Numi cufici ex variis museis selecti (1823)
Notice d'une centaine d'ouvrages arabes, &c., qui manquent en grande partie aux bibliothèques de l'Europe (1834)
Nova supplementa ad recensionem Num. Muham. Acad. Imp. Sci. Petropolitanae (1855)
His description of some medals struck by the Samanid and Bouid princes (1804) was composed in Arabic because he had no Latin types.

Correspondence 

Frähn had vivid correspondence with other academics. Among them also Samuel Gottlieb Rudolph Henzi, professor in Tartu.

Notes 

 

1782 births
1851 deaths
German numismatists
19th-century German historians
People from the Duchy of Mecklenburg-Schwerin
University of Rostock alumni
Academic staff of the University of Rostock
University of Göttingen alumni
University of Tübingen alumni
Full members of the Saint Petersburg Academy of Sciences
German male non-fiction writers
German librarians
Directors of Asiatic Museum